Georgina García Pérez and Fanny Stollár were the defending champions, but chose not to participate together. García Pérez played alongside Renata Voráčová, but lost in the quarterfinals to Anna Blinkova and Anastasia Potapova.

Stollár played alongside Heather Watson, but lost in the final to Ekaterina Alexandrova and Vera Zvonareva, 4–6, 6–4, [7–10].

Seeds

Draw

Draw

References

External links
Main Draw

Hungarian Ladies Open - Doubles
2019 Doubles
Lad